Chlaenius purpuricollis is a species of ground beetle in the large and diverse genus Chlaenius.

External links

Licininae